Megesheim is a municipality in the district of Donau-Ries in Bavaria in Germany.

References

Donau-Ries